Neckermann may refer to:

 Josef Neckermann (1912–1992), German entrepreneur and equestrian
 Karl Neckermann (1911–1984), German athlete
 Neckermann Versand AG, German mail order and travel company